Dean Kolstad (born June 16, 1968) is a Canadian former professional ice hockey player.  He was drafted in the second round, 33rd overall, by the Minnesota North Stars in the 1986 NHL Entry Draft.  He played forty games in the National Hockey League: thirty with the North Stars in the 1988–89 and 1990–91 seasons, and ten with the San Jose Sharks (who selected him in the 1991 NHL Dispersal Draft) in the 1992–93 season.

Kolstad was born in Edmonton, Alberta.

Career statistics

Awards
 WHL East Second All-Star Team – 1988

External links

1968 births
Living people
Binghamton Rangers players
Canadian ice hockey defencemen
Central Texas Stampede players
Ice hockey people from Edmonton
Kalamazoo Wings (1974–2000) players
Kansas City Blades players
Minnesota Moose players
Minnesota North Stars draft picks
Minnesota North Stars players
New Westminster Bruins players
Portland Pirates players
Prince Albert Raiders players
San Jose Sharks players